Atwood may refer to:

Places

United States
 Atwood, Placentia, California
 Atwood, Colorado
 Atwood, Illinois
 Atwood, Indiana
 Atwood, Iowa
 Atwood, Kansas
 Atwood, Kentucky
 Atwood, Michigan
 Atwood, Nevada
 Atwood, Oklahoma
 Atwood, Pennsylvania
 Atwood, Tennessee
 Atwood, Wisconsin

Elsewhere 
 Atwood (crater), a crater on the moon named after George Atwood
 Atwood, Ontario, Canada

Other uses
 Atwood (surname)
 Ryan Atwood, a character on the television series The O.C.
 Atwood Oceanics, a defunct offshore oil and gas drilling company, now part of Valaris plc
 Atwood Stadium, an athletic facility in Flint, Michigan

See also
 Atwood machine
 Atwood number
 Swinging Atwood's machine